Francisco Cisneros y Mendoza (1644–1724) was a Roman Catholic prelate who served as Auxiliary Bishop of Lima (1702–1724) and Titular Bishop of Mactaris (1702–1724).

Biography
Francisco Cisneros y Mendoza was born in 1644 in Lima, Peru.
On June 12, 1702, he was selected by the King of Spain and confirmed by Pope Clement XI as Auxiliary Bishop of Lima and Titular Bishop of Mactaris. in November 1703, he was consecrated bishop by Melchor Liñán y Cisneros, Archbishop of Lima. He served as Auxiliary Bishop of Lima until his death in 1724.

While bishop, he was the principal consecrator of Nicolás Urbán de Mota y Haro, Bishop of La Paz (1703); Diego Montero del Aguila, Bishop of Concepción (1710); and Antonio de Zuloaga, Archbishop of Lima (1715).

References

External links and additional sources
 (for Chronology of Bishops) 
 (for Chronology of Bishops) 
 (for Chronology of Bishops) 
 (for Chronology of Bishops)  

1644 births
1724 deaths
Bishops appointed by Pope Clement XI
People of colonial Peru
17th-century Roman Catholic bishops in Peru
Roman Catholic bishops of Lima